There are several municipalities and communities that have the name Grafenried.

in Bavaria, Germany 

Grafenried Gem. Nittendorf
Grafenried (Sinzing), Regensburg
Grafenried (Regen), Regen
Grafenried (Cham), Cham

In Switzerland

Grafenried, Switzerland, in the Canton of Bern